Aprionus is a genus of wood midges in the family Cecidomyiidae. There are at least 137 described species in Aprionus. The genus was established by Jean-Jacques Kieffer in 1894.

See also
 List of Aprionus species

References

Further reading

External links

 

Cecidomyiidae genera

Taxa named by Jean-Jacques Kieffer
Insects described in 1894